Nueva Esperanza (Pando) is a small town in Bolivia.

References

Populated places in Pando Department